Sollamale is a 1998 Indian Tamil-language romantic drama film directed by Sasi, who made his directorial debut with the film. The film stars Livingston and Kausalya while Karan, Vivek, Anand, and Prakash Raj play supporting roles. The film opened in July 1998 to positive reviews and became a box office success.

It was later remade Telugu as Seenu (1999) and in Hindi as Pyaar Diwana Hota Hai (2002). It was also dubbed into Hindi as Dil Faink.

Plot
Nataraj is an honest, not-too-good-looking, village artist who comes to the city to find a job. He ends up being a banner artist. Shweta is a US citizen who loves India and its culture and stays with her relatives to learn Bharatnatyam. She is a soft-natured, loving girl who loves to help people in distress but cannot stand it if anyone lies or cheats. Initially when these two meet, she mistakes Nataraj to be a mute and pities him. Shweta's occasional friendlier association with Nataraj, in the means of helping, gradually blossoms into love. By this time, it is too late for the guilt-ridden Nataraj to disclose the truth as he feared the risk of losing her. Despite all his efforts to reveal the truth, Shwetha discovers his sham by herself. However at the end, she realises Nataraj's true intentions for acting as a mute and forgives him. However at the climax, when Shwetha asks Nadaraj to speak to her, he keeps silent because he had asked a doctor to cut his tongue so that he could be the Nataraj that Swetha had come to love.

Cast

 Livingston as Nataraj
 Kausalya as Shweta
 Karan as Vikram
 Vivek as Wilson
 Anand as Riyaz
 Sakthi Kumar as Vaiyapuri
 Prakash Raj as Dr. Surya Prakash
 Dhamu as Shanmugam, painter
 Vaiyapuri as Painter
 Fathima Babu as Vikram's mother
 Mohan Ram as Vikram's father
 Lavanya as Shweta's friend
 Crane Manohar as Hairdresser
 Bava Lakshmanan
 M. J. Shriram as Advertising agency owner
 Raju Sundaram in a special appearance
 Kalyan in a special appearance
 Alphonsa in a special appearance
 Kanal Kannan as Coconut Seller (special appearance)

Soundtrack
Soundtrack was composed by debutant Bobby.

Release
Initially, Sasi had Prabhu Deva to play the lead role for the script, but Choudary insisted Livingston to do the lead role. The film brought Livingston acclaim after years of playing supporting roles. The film began Sasi's career in Tamil films and he has since gone on to direct other successful romance stories including Rojakootam (2002) and Dishyum (2006). Bobby went on to win the Tamil Nadu State Film Award for Best Music Director for his music in the film. Indolink wrote "Amidst all the recent love stories that go like 'Boy does not meet girl, boy loves girl,..' etc. this has a refreshingly new story line.  The story and the way the movie is made is very simple and it is this simplicity that makes the movie good".

Remakes

References

External links
 

1998 films
Tamil films remade in other languages
1990s Tamil-language films
Films directed by Sasi (director)
Super Good Films films